The arrondissement of Rodez is an arrondissement of France in the Aveyron department in the Occitanie region. It has 79 communes.

Composition

The communes of the arrondissement of Rodez, and their INSEE codes, are:

 Argences-en-Aubrac (12223)
 Bertholène (12026)
 Bessuéjouls (12027)
 Bozouls (12033)
 Brommat (12036)
 Campagnac (12047)
 Campouriez (12048)
 Campuac (12049)
 Cantoin (12051)
 La Capelle-Bonance (12055)
 Cassuéjouls (12058)
 Castelnau-de-Mandailles (12061)
 Le Cayrol (12064)
 Clairvaux-d'Aveyron (12066)
 Condom-d'Aubrac (12074)
 Conques-en-Rouergue (12076)
 Coubisou (12079)
 Curières (12088)
 Druelle Balsac (12090)
 Entraygues-sur-Truyère (12094)
 Espalion (12096)
 Espeyrac (12097)
 Estaing (12098)
 Le Fel (12093)
 Florentin-la-Capelle (12103)
 Gabriac (12106)
 Gaillac-d'Aveyron (12107)
 Golinhac (12110)
 Huparlac (12116)
 Lacroix-Barrez (12118)
 Laguiole (12119)
 Laissac-Sévérac-l'Église (12120)
 Lassouts (12124)
 La Loubière (12131)
 Luc-la-Primaube (12133)
 Marcillac-Vallon (12138)
 Le Monastère (12146)
 Montézic (12151)
 Montpeyroux (12156)
 Montrozier (12157)
 Mouret (12161)
 Mur-de-Barrez (12164)
 Muret-le-Château (12165)
 Murols (12166)
 Nauviale (12171)
 Le Nayrac (12172)
 Olemps (12174)
 Onet-le-Château (12176)
 Palmas-d'Aveyron (12177)
 Pierrefiche (12182)
 Pomayrols (12184)
 Prades-d'Aubrac (12187)
 Pruines (12193)
 Rodelle (12201)
 Rodez (12202)
 Saint-Amans-des-Cots (12209)
 Saint-Christophe-Vallon (12215)
 Saint-Chély-d'Aubrac (12214)
 Saint-Côme-d'Olt (12216)
 Sainte-Eulalie-d'Olt (12219)
 Sainte-Radegonde (12241)
 Saint-Félix-de-Lunel (12221)
 Saint-Geniez-d'Olt-et-d'Aubrac (12224)
 Saint-Hippolyte (12226)
 Saint-Laurent-d'Olt (12237)
 Saint-Martin-de-Lenne (12239)
 Saint-Saturnin-de-Lenne (12247)
 Saint-Symphorien-de-Thénières (12250)
 Salles-la-Source (12254)
 Sébazac-Concourès (12264)
 Sébrazac (12265)
 Sénergues (12268)
 Sévérac-d'Aveyron (12270)
 Soulages-Bonneval (12273)
 Taussac (12277)
 Thérondels (12280)
 Valady (12288)
 Villecomtal (12298)
 Vimenet (12303)

History

The arrondissement of Rodez was created in 1800. At the January 2017 reorganization of the arrondissements of Aveyron, it lost 19 communes to the arrondissement of Millau and 34 communes to the arrondissement of Villefranche-de-Rouergue, and it gained six communes from the arrondissement of Millau.

As a result of the reorganisation of the cantons of France which came into effect in 2015, the borders of the cantons are no longer related to the borders of the arrondissements. The cantons of the arrondissement of Rodez were, as of January 2015:

 Baraqueville-Sauveterre
 Bozouls
 Cassagnes-Bégonhès
 Conques
 Entraygues-sur-Truyère
 Espalion
 Estaing
 Laguiole
 Laissac
 Marcillac-Vallon
 Mur-de-Barrez
 Naucelle
 Pont-de-Salars
 Réquista
 Rignac
 Rodez-Est
 Rodez-Nord
 Rodez-Ouest
 Saint-Amans-des-Cots
 Saint-Chély-d'Aubrac
 Sainte-Geneviève-sur-Argence
 Saint-Geniez-d'Olt
 La Salvetat-Peyralès

References

Rodez